Fundidores de Monterrey (English: Monterrey Smelters), officially Fundidores, are an American football team based in Monterrey, Mexico. The Fundidores compete in the Liga de Fútbol Americano Profesional (LFA), the top American football league in Mexico. The team plays its home games at the Estadio Banorte.

History

Origins
Monterrey has an important American football tradition. It is home of two of the most popular college football teams: the Auténticos Tigres of the Autonomous University of Nuevo León and the Borregos Salvajes of the Monterrey Institute of Technology and Higher Education. The city was also home for a short time to the Mexico Golden Aztecs of the Continental Football League.

In the late 90s, Monterrey had a semi-professional team playing in the Liga Nacional Master (Master National League), Cerveceros de Monterrey (Monterrey Brewers), who were national champions in 1995.

Early years
The Fundidores (Spanish for smelters or founders) were founded in September 2016 as part of the 2017 LFA's expansion, this expansion also included another team in the North of Mexico: the Dinos de Saltillo. The name is a reference to the city's Steel Foundry Company, that operated from 1900 to 1986 in what is now the Fundidora Park.

The team debuted at the Liga de Fútbol Americano Profesional in the 2017 season. On week 2, at the game against the Dinos, former NFL player, Chad Johnson, made its debut (and only appearance) with the team and scored on a 41-yard touchdown reception to help the Fundidores win the game. Monterrey ended the season with a 2–5 record, not qualifying for the playoffs.

For the 2018 season, the Fundidores failed again to qualify for the playoffs after finishing with a 2–5 regular season record.

Carlos Strevel era (2020–present)
Carlos Strevel was presented as head coach of the Fundidores ahead of the 2020 season. Strevel had previous experience as coach and administrator for several youth and college football programs in Mexico, most notably with the Borregos Salvajes CEM.

In December 2020, Strevel felt into coma derived from COVID-19 complications. After recovering, Strevel returned to the Fundidores training camp in 2022, once the LFA authorized the 2022 season to be played.

Strevel led the Fundidores to their first Tazón México championship in 2022, after defeating the Gallos Negros de Querétaro 18–14 in the Tazón México V, played in Tijuana.

Stadiums

For their first season in Liga de Fútbol Americano Profesional, the Fundidores played their home games at the Estadio Tecnológico which had been used previously for football matches by C.F. Monterrey, but, in that moment, Fundidores were the only tenant, since Monterrey had already moved to the Estadio BBVA Bancomer.

On 9 April 2017 Fundidores played their last match at Estadio Tecnológico before it was demolished.

For the 2018 season, Fundidores moved to Estadio Nuevo León Unido, a stadium with a 1,500 spectators capacity and artificial turf owned by the Government of Nuevo León.

In 2020, the team moved to Estadio Borregos, with a capacity of 10,057 spectators, a major upgrade, since Estadio Nuevo León Unido could only accommodate 1,500 people. The stadium is owned by the Monterrey Institute of Technology and Higher Education and it is used by college football team Borregos Salvajes Monterrey.

The Fundidores debuted in their new stadium on 14 February 2020 in a match against rivals Dinos de Saltillo in the Clásico del Norte (Northern Classic), where they lost 15–23.

Rivals

Dinos de Saltillo
Fundidores and Dinos are from northern Mexico and were divisional rivals since the establishment of the divisional system in the LFA in 2017, which was later discarded in 2022. The rivalry between the two cities, Saltillo and Monterrey, dates back to the times of the Liga Nacional de Futbol Americano (National American Football League) in the late 90s, when both cities had fierce matches between their two teams: the Dinosaurios (Dinosaurs) and the Cerveceros (Brewers). The rivalry goes beyond the gridiron, since both teams fight season after season to get the best college players from Nuevo León and Coahuila. The rivalry is known as Clásico del Norte (Northern Classic).

Roster

Staff

Season-by-season

Championships

Tazón México championships

Notable players
 Chad Johnson – WR (2017, one game)
 José Carlos Maltos – K (2017–2019)
 René Brassea – OL (2019)
 Kasey Peters – QB (2019)
 Jalen Conwell – RB (2020)
 Shelton Eppler – QB (2022) League MVP

References

Liga de Fútbol Americano Profesional teams
2016 establishments in Mexico
American football teams established in 2016
Sports teams in Monterrey